2 Samuel 4 is the fourth chapter of the Second Book of Samuel in the Old Testament of the Christian Bible or the second part of Books of Samuel in the Hebrew Bible. According to Jewish tradition  the book was attributed to the prophet Samuel, with additions by the prophets Gad and Nathan, but modern scholars view it as a composition of a number of independent texts of various ages from c. 630–540 BCE. This chapter contains the account of David's reign in Hebron. This is within a section comprising 1 Samuel 16 to 2 Samuel 5 which records the rise of David as the king of Israel, and a section comprising 2 Samuel 2–8 which deals with the period when David set up his kingdom.

Text
This chapter was originally written in the Hebrew language. It is divided into 12 verses.

Textual witnesses
Some early manuscripts containing the text of this chapter in Hebrew are of the Masoretic Text tradition, which includes the Codex Cairensis (895), Aleppo Codex (10th century), and Codex Leningradensis (1008). Fragments containing parts of this chapter in Hebrew were found among the Dead Sea Scrolls including 4Q51 (4QSam; 100–50 BCE) with extant verses 1–4, 9–12.

Extant ancient manuscripts of a translation into Koine Greek known as the Septuagint (originally was made in the last few centuries BCE) include Codex Vaticanus (B; B; 4th century) and Codex Alexandrinus (A; A; 5th century).

Places 

Beeroth
Gibeon
Hebron
Jezreel
Ziklag

Analysis
The narrative of David's reign in Hebron in 2 Samuel 1:1–5:5 has the following structure:
A. Looking back to the final scenes of 1 Samuel (1:1)
B. David receives Saul's crown (1:2–12)
C. David executes Saul's killer (1:13–16)
D. David's lament for Saul and Jonathan (1:17-27)
E. Two kings in the land (2:1–3:6)
E'. One king in the land: Abner switches sides (3:7–27)
D'. David's lament for Abner (3:28–39)
C'. David executes Ishbaal's killers (4:1–12)
B'. David wears Saul's crown (5:1–3)
A'. Looking forward to David's reign in Jerusalem (5:4–5)

David's narrative of his ascension to the throne in Hebron is framed by an opening verse that looks backward to the final chapters of 1 Samuel (Saul's death and David's refuge in Ziklag) and closing verses that look forward to David's rule in Jerusalem (2 Samuel 5). The action begins when David received Saul's crown and concludes when he was finally able to wear that crown. David executes the Amalekite who claims to have assisted Saul with his suicide and those who murdered Ishbaal. Two laments were recorded: one for Saul and Jonathan and another shorter one for Abner. At the center are the two key episodes: the existence of two kings in the land (David and Ishbaal), because Joab's forces could not conquer Saul's territory on the battlefield. However, this was resolved when Ishbaal foolishly challenged Abner's loyalty, causing Abner to switch sides that eventually brought
Saul's kingdom under Davidic rule.

Death of Ish-bosheth (4:1–7)
Abner was very powerful that he virtually ruled Israel (cf. 2:8-9; 3:6), so his death caused confusion and uncertainty to the whole kingdom including its king, leading a plot to assassinate Ish-bosheth by two army officers of Israel, Baanah and Rechab, whose lineage is detailed in verses 2–3 and came from Beeroth, which 'was considered to belong to Benjamin' (verse 2, cf. Joshua 18:25). The two assassins got into Ishbaal's house at
noon, when he was taking a siesta, on the pretext of "taking wheat" to be allowed to enter, quickly committed their gruesome task and ran away with Ish-bosheth's severed head (verse 7).

A short information was given in verse 4 about Jonathan's son, Mephibosheth (or Meribaal, cf. 1 Chronicles 8:34; 9:40), which links to 2 Samuel 9:1–13, apparently to show that, beside Ish-bosheth, there was no more serious contender for the throne from the house of Saul; Mephibosheth himself was only a minor ('five years old') at that time and a cripple.

Verse 2
And Saul's son had two men that were captains of bands: the name of the one was Baanah, and the name of the other Rechab, the sons of Rimmon a Beerothite, of the children of Benjamin: (for Beeroth also was reckoned to Benjamin:
"Beeroth": one of the four cities of the Gibeonites (Joshua 9:17), and was allotted to the tribe of Benjamin (Joshua 18:25). It is identified with the modern El-Bireh, nine miles north of Jerusalem. It is mentioned that Beeroth “was reckoned to Benjamin,” in the past tense, because in the time the Books of Samuel was written it was no longer inhabited.

Verse 4
Jonathan, Saul’s son, had a son who was lame in his feet. He was five years old when the news about Saul and Jonathan came from Jezreel; and his nurse took him up and fled. And it happened, as she made haste to flee, that he fell and became lame. His name was Mephibosheth.
"Mephibosheth": written as "Merib-Baal" in 1 Chronicles 8:34; 9:40.

Execution of Rechab and Baanah (4:8–12)
The two assassins brought Ish-bosheth's head straight to David, claiming to have avenged David on Saul, who was described as an 'enemy' for Saul had sought David's life (verse 8). David immediately distanced himself from their action, as he had consistently showed a great respect for a reigning monarch and did not wish to seize the throne, because being YHWH's elect, he was to advance naturally to be a king without having to stoop to violence. His attitude was made explicit in verses 9–11, recalling how he commanded to kill the Amalekite who claimed to have killed Saul, so he had to punish these assassins to death for they had 'killed a righteous man on his bed in his own house' (verse 11–12). Thus, the narratives demonstrate that David was totally innocent of the assassinations that brought him to the throne.

Verse 12
And David commanded his young men, and they slew them, and cut off their hands and their feet, and hanged them up over the pool in Hebron. But they took the head of Ishbosheth, and buried it in the sepulchre of Abner in Hebron.
"Ish-bosheth: 4QSam reads “Mephibosheth”.
"Abner": the name is followed by the phrase "the son of Ner" in Greek Septuagint versions.
“In Hebron": not included in some Greek Septuagint manuscripts

See also

Related Bible parts: 1 Samuel 26, 2 Samuel 1, 1 Chronicles 8, 1 Chronicles 9

Notes

References

Sources

Commentaries on Samuel

General

External links
 Jewish translations:
 Samuel II - II Samuel - Chapter 4 (Judaica Press). Hebrew text and English translation [with Rashi's commentary] at Chabad.org
 Christian translations:
 Online Bible at GospelHall.org (ESV, KJV, Darby, American Standard Version, Bible in Basic English)
 2 Samuel chapter 4. Bible Gateway

04
Gibeon (ancient city)